Christian Lusch (born February 19, 1981 in Bühl (Baden)) is a German sport shooter.

He was born in Bühl (Baden), Germany.  He represented Germany at the 2004 Summer Olympic Games, and won the silver medal in the rifle, prone, at 50 metres, and came in 12th in the rifle, prone, three positions, at 50 metres.  He shares in the world record at 50 m rifle prone, with a 600 he shot in 2004.

Current world record in 50 m rifle prone

References

External links
issf bio

1981 births
Living people
German male sport shooters
Olympic shooters of Germany
Shooters at the 2004 Summer Olympics
Olympic silver medalists for Germany
Medalists at the 2004 Summer Olympics
Olympic medalists in shooting